Leptotrophon minirotundus is a species of sea snail, a marine gastropod mollusk in the family Muricidae, the murex snails or rock snails.

Description
The length of the shell attains 5 mm.

Distribution
This species occurs in the Pacific Ocean offNew Caledonia at depths between 250 m and 350 m.

References

 Houart R. (1986 ["1985"]) Mollusca Gastropoda: Noteworthy Muricidae from the Pacific Ocean, with description of seven new species. Mémoires du Muséum National d'Histoire Naturelle, A, 133: 427–455. [March 1986] page(s): 438

External links
 Houart R. & Héros V. (2012) New species of Muricidae (Gastropoda) and additional or noteworthy records from the western Pacific. Zoosystema 34(1): 21-37 page(s): 31

Muricidae
Gastropods described in 1986